Edy Reinalter (24 December 1920 – 19 November 1962) was an Alpine skier and 1948 Olympic champion in Slalom. He is the first Swiss athlete to win a gold medal at an Olympic Games held in Switzerland.

References 
 

1920 births
1962 deaths
Swiss male alpine skiers
Olympic alpine skiers of Switzerland
Olympic gold medalists for Switzerland
Olympic medalists in alpine skiing
Medalists at the 1948 Winter Olympics
Alpine skiers at the 1948 Winter Olympics